Wouter Knijff (1605, Wesel – 1694, Bergen op Zoom), was a Dutch Golden Age landscape painter.

Biography
According to the RKD he was the nephew of Janneke Knijff who married Jan Vermeer van Ham, the grandparents of the Haarlem painter Jan Vermeer van Haarlem the Elder. Knijff became a member of the Haarlem Guild of St. Luke in 1640 and became the father and teacher of the painters Jacob, Willem and Leendert.
He was a follower of Jan van Goyen who taught his sons and was followed by the monogrammists AVZ, PHB, TVB, and Balthasar van der Veen.

References

Wouter Knijff on Artnet

1605 births
1694 deaths
Dutch Golden Age painters
Dutch male painters
People from Wesel
Painters from Haarlem